Batia Ofer is a philanthropist and art collector. She is married to Idan Ofer, a billionaire who inherited half of his father's shipping empire.

Career 
In 2007, Ofer worked at Better Place, an electric car venture. She is a trustee of the Royal Academy of Arts and a member of Sotheby’s International Council. She first became involved with the Make-A-Wish foundation after her sister died at the age of 26. In 2017 she founded Art of Wishes, which organises twice-yearly gala events to raise money for Make-A-Wish Foundation UK.

Ofer is a board member of the Peres Center for Peace and the Dean’s Executive Board at Harvard Kennedy School.

In 2018 she accused the artist Banksy of creating antisemitic artwork.

Personal life 
Ofer was born in Israel and now lives in the UK with her husband Idan Ofer and their children. The couple was listed by ARTnews magazine among the Top 200 art collectors in the world.

References

Art collectors from London
Jewish art collectors
Jewish philanthropists
Living people
Year of birth missing (living people)